Yang Pengju (born 6 June 2000) is a Chinese footballer currently playing as a defender for Zibo Cuju.

Club career
Yang was invited to join the academy of Valencia as part of the Wanda Group initiative to bring young Chinese players to Spanish clubs.

Yang Pengju would be promoted to the senior team of Dalian Pro in the 2021 Chinese Super League season before being loaned out to second tier club Beijing BSU where he made his debut in a league game on 12 July 2021 against Zhejiang in a 1-0 victory.

Career statistics
.

References

External links

2000 births
Living people
Chinese footballers
Association football defenders
China League One players
Valencia CF players
Dalian Professional F.C. players
Beijing Sport University F.C. players
Chinese expatriate footballers
Chinese expatriate sportspeople in Spain
Expatriate footballers in Spain